Shiocton Airport , is a privately owned public use airport located  northwest of the central business district of Shiocton, a village in Outagamie County, Wisconsin, United States.

Although most U.S. airports use the same three-letter location identifier for the FAA and IATA, this airport is assigned W34 by the FAA but has no designation from the IATA.

Facilities and aircraft 

It has two runways: 18/36 is 2,200 by 110 feet (671 x 34 m) with a turf surface; 9/27 is 1,315 by 110 feet (401 x 34 m), also with a turf surface.

For the 12-month period ending June 24, 2020, the airport had 4,000 aircraft operations, an average of 11 per day: all general aviation.
In January 2023, there were 16 aircraft based at this airport: 13 single-engine and 3 ultra-light.

See also
List of airports in Wisconsin

References

External links 
 shioctonairport.com Airport website
 

Airports in Wisconsin
Buildings and structures in Outagamie County, Wisconsin
Transportation in Outagamie County, Wisconsin